William Howard Taft University is an private for-profit online university headquartered in Denver, Colorado. Founded in 1976 as a graduate school providing continuing education for certified public accountants, the university provides distance education and offers academic programs up to the doctoral level. William Howard Taft University and Taft Law School together form the Taft University System.

History
The university was founded in 1976, and received full accreditation in 2003 from the Distance Education and Training Council. William Howard Taft University's Doctor of Education program was suspended in 2003 in order for the university to obtain Distance Education and Training Council accreditation, since DETC did not accredit doctoral programs at the time. In 2009, when DETC’s scope of authority was expanded to include professional doctorates, the program was resumed.

Starting in 2006, it has offered a Master of Education degree. In 2010, it began offering the Doctor of Business Administration and B.S. in Business Administration.

Academics
William Howard Taft University offers an online Bachelor's degree completion program in business administration, Master of Business Administration (MBA) degree programs, and Master's degree programs in taxation (MST) and education (M.Ed.). Doctoral degree programs are offered in business (DBA) and education (EdD).

The university is accredited by the Accrediting Commission of the Distance Education Accrediting Commission.

References

External links
 Official site

Distance Education Accreditation Commission
Distance education institutions based in the United States
Educational institutions established in 1976
Taft
1976 establishments in Colorado
Private universities and colleges in Colorado